Ganesocoris is a genus of assassin bugs.

Partial list of species 
 Ganesocoris angiportus  (Distant, 1903)
 Ganesocoris serratus Miller, 1955

References 

Reduviidae
Cimicomorpha genera